Cotton plants (Gossypium species) are used as food plants by the larvae of a number of Lepidoptera species including:

Monophagous species which feed exclusively on Gossypium

Bucculatrix leaf-miners:
B. gossypiella
B. gossypii
B. loxoptila
Hypercompe campinasa

Polyphagous species which feed on Gossypium among other plants

Brown-tail (Euproctis chrysorrhoea)
Bucculatrix leaf-miners:
B. ruficoma
B. thurberiella
Cotton bollworm (Helicoverpa armigera)
Garden dart (Euxoa nigricans)
Hypercompe species:
H. cermelii
H. hambletoni
Native budworm (Helicoverpa punctigera)
Nutmeg (Discestra trifolii)
Turnip moth (Agrotis segetum)

External links

Cotton
+Lepidoptera